Gilbert Desmet (born 2 February 1931 in Roeselare), nicknamed Smetje van Lichtervelde, is a former Belgian cyclist who was professional from 1952 to 1967. In the 1956 Tour de France, he wore the yellow jersey for 2 days, and in the 1963 Tour de France he wore it for 9 days. Desmet won 101 professional races, including Paris–Tours, La Flèche Wallonne and Four Days of Dunkirk. His best result in the Tour de France was his 4th place in 1962. He finished second in the 1959 Paris–Roubaix.

Throughout his career, he was often confused with Gilbert De Smet, another Belgian cyclist with a similar name.

Major results

1951
 2nd Kattekoers
1954
 1st GP Stad Zottegem
 8th Omloop Het Volk
1956
 Tour de France
Held  after Stages 3–4a
 1st Overall Drielandentrofee
1st Stage 1
 1st Omloop van Oost-Vlaanderen
 2nd Overall Four Days of Dunkirk
 2nd Vijfbergenomloop
1957
 1st Omloop van het Houtland
 2nd Overall Driedaagse van Antwerpen
 6th Kuurne–Brussels–Kuurne
1958
 1st Paris–Tours
 1st Kuurne–Brussels–Kuurne
 1st Omloop van het Houtland
 1st Stage 7 Vuelta a España
 2nd Grand Prix Jules Lowie
 3rd GP Lugano
1959
 1st Vijfbergenomloop
 2nd Paris–Roubaix
 3rd Tour of Flanders
 3rd Overall Vuelta a la Comunidad Valenciana
 5th La Flèche Wallonne
 8th Gent–Wevelgem
 8th Overall Giro di Sardegna
 9th Liège–Bastogne–Liège
1960
 1st Overall Menton–Genoa–Rome
1st Stage 1
 1st Kampioenschap van Vlaanderen
 1st Grand Prix Jules Lowie
 1st Stage 3 Paris–Nice
 2nd GP Lugano
 4th Tour of Flanders
 5th Kuurne–Brussels–Kuurne
 7th Paris–Roubaix
1961
 1st Gran Premio Industria e Commercio di Prato
 1st Stage 1 Giro di Sardegna
 2nd Paris–Tours
 2nd Paris–Brussels
 2nd Grand Prix des Nations
 3rd Trofeo Matteotti
 7th Gent–Wevelgem
 10th Paris–Roubaix
1962
 1st De Kustpijl
 1st Omloop der drie Provinciën
 4th Overall Tour de France
 4th Overall Tour de Suisse
1st Stage 5
1963
 Tour de France
Held  after Stages 6–16
 6th Road race, UCI Road World Championships
 7th Grand Prix des Nations
 9th Milan–San Remo
1964
 1st  Overall Four Days of Dunkirk
 1st La Flèche Wallonne
 1st Stage 2 Tour de Luxembourg
 3rd Overall Tour of Belgium
 5th Paris–Brussels
 6th Brabantse Pijl
 8th Overall Tour de France
 9th Tour of Flanders
 9th Paris–Roubaix
1965
 1st Omloop van het Houtland
 1st Stage 2b Critérium du Dauphiné Libéré
 2nd Overall Tour of Belgium
 8th Liège–Bastogne–Liège
 9th La Flèche Wallonne
1966
 2nd Omloop van het Houtland
1967
 8th Overall Paris–Nice
1968
 1st Ronde van Oost-Vlaanderen

References

Notes
Cornillië, Patrick (1994). Lichtervelde op twee wielen . De Beer.
Cornillië, Patrick (2004). Gilbert  Desmet – Smetje van Lichtervelde . De Eecloonaar.

External links

Palmares 
Short biography 
Team index 

Belgian male cyclists
1931 births
Living people
People from Roeselare
Tour de Suisse stage winners
Cyclists from West Flanders
Belgian Vuelta a España stage winners